Blood of the Virgins is a 1967 Argentine gothic horror film directed by Emilio Vieyra.

Plot
Ofelia's wedding day is approaching and she is to be married to Eduardo. She has some pre-wedding jitters during a meeting with her lover Gustavo but decides to tie the knot anyway. On her wedding night, Gustavo shows up in their room, murders Eduardo, and proceeds to turn Ofelia into a vampire so that they can be together forever. In the present day 1960's, a group of young men and women take shelter in an abandoned lodge after their van breaks down. Soon, Ofelia appears and seduces one of the guys and meanwhile the girls go missing. It is up to the other guys to figure out what is happening and Ofelia must make a decision as to how much longer she can continue with her cursed life.

Cast
Ricardo Bauleo	... 	Tito Ledesma
Susana Beltrán	... 	Ofelia
Gloria Prat	... 	Laura
Walter Kliche	... 	Gustavo
Rolo Puente	... 	Raúl Aguilar
Emilio Vieyra	... 	Comisario Martinez

External links
 

1967 films
1960s Spanish-language films
1967 horror films
Vampires in film
Argentine horror films
1960s Argentine films
Films directed by Emilio Vieyra